Borstal Institution & Juvenile Jail Faisalabad is in Faisalabad, Pakistan. It operates in accordance with provisions of Juvenile Justice System Ordinance 2000 and Punjab Juvenile Justice System Rules 2002.

See also
 Government of Punjab, Pakistan
 Punjab Prisons (Pakistan)
 Prison Officer
 Headquarter Jail
 National Academy for Prisons Administration
 Punjab Prisons Staff Training Institute

References

External links
 Official Website of Punjab Prisons (Pakistan)

Prisons in Pakistan
Faisalabad
Youth detention centers
Buildings and structures in Faisalabad
2005 establishments in Pakistan